Etienneus is a monotypic genus of Thelyphonid whip scorpions, first described by Jacqueline Heurtault in 1984.<ref>{{Cite journal |last=Heurtault |first=Jacqueline |date=1984 |title=Identité d'Hypoctonus africanus Hentschel et dHypoctonus clarki Cooke et Shadab (Arachnides, Uropyges) |journal=Revue Arachnologique |volume=5 |pages=115–123| url=https://www.european-arachnology.org/esa/wp-content/uploads/2015/08/115-123_Heurtault.pdf}}</ref> Its single species, Etienneus africanus''''' is distributed in West Africa.

References 

Arachnid genera
Monotypic arachnid genera
Uropygi